Emily Louise van Egmond (born 12 July 1993) is an Australian professional soccer player who plays as a midfielder for San Diego Wave FC and the Australia women's national team. She previously played for German side 1. FFC Frankfurt and VfL Wolfsburg in the Bundesliga, Danish side Fortuna Hjørring in the Elitedivisionen, Chicago Red Stars and Orlando Pride in the NWSL, West Ham United in the FA Women's Super League, as well as Canberra United, Western Sydney Wanderers, Newcastle Jets and Melbourne City in Australia's W-League.

Early life
Van Egmond was raised in Newcastle, Australia. She began playing football at the age of five. She is the daughter of former Socceroo and Newcastle United Jets A-League coach, Gary van Egmond.

Club career

Canberra United (2009–2011)
Van Egmond played for Canberra United from 2009 through 2011. During the 2009 season, she made six appearances for the club and scored one goal. During the 2010/11 season, she played in seven matches and scored one goal.

Fortuna Hjørring (2011–2012)
Van Egmond played for Fortuna Hjørring during the 2011–12 UEFA Women's Champions League after being scouted by the team at the 2011 FIFA Women's World Cup.  She made one appearance for the club during a match against BSC YB Frauen.

Newcastle Jets (2011–2013)
Van Egmond returned to the Newcastle Jets for the 2012–2013 season. She scored four goals in the eight matches she started and played in.

Western New York Flash (2012)
During the summer of 2012, van Egmond played for the Western New York Flash in the Women's Premier Soccer League Elite, the top division women's soccer league at the time. The team clinched the league championship. During the championship final, the Flash defeated the Chicago Red Stars 4–3 on penalties. Van Egmond scored on the fourth penalty for the Flash giving them a 3–2 lead. The Red Stars missed their fourth penalty and the championship title was sealed by Angela Salem's successful fifth penalty.

Seattle Reign FC (2013)
On 12 July 2013, American side Seattle Reign FC signed van Egmond for the remainder of the inaugural season of the National Women's Soccer League. She made her debut for the club during a match against the Washington Spirit in which the Reign won 2–1. Van Egmond made six appearances for the Reign including four starts, tallying 296 minutes on the pitch.

Western Sydney Wanderers (2013–2014)

Van Egmond signed with Western Sydney Wanderers at the beginning of the 2013–14 season.

Chicago Red Stars (2014)
In May 2014, van Egmond joined Chicago Red Stars of the NWSL.
She was waived by the Chicago Red Stars in September 2014.

Newcastle Jets (2014–2015)
Ahead of the 2014 season, van Egmond returned again to the Newcastle Jets.

1. FFC Frankfurt (2015–2016)
On 12 June 2015, van Egmond joined German Frauen-Bundesliga club 1. FFC Frankfurt.

VfL Wolfsburg (2016–2017)
On 23 August 2016, van Egmond joined Bundesliga club VfL Wolfsburg on a two-year deal. On 13 October 2017, van Egmond left VfL Wolfsburg to return to Australia.

Newcastle Jets (2017)
Despite initial reports by VfL Wolfsburg, Newcastle Jets coach Craig Deans confirmed that the club had not signed van Egmond directly from VfL Wolfsburg. A few days later however, Newcastle Jets found the funds to sign her to their W-League squad.

Orlando Pride (2018–2020)
On 14 February 2018, Orlando Pride announced that they had signed van Egmond. Van Egmond made her debut for the Pride on 28 April 2018.

On 15 August 2019, Orlando Pride announced that van Egmond would undergo season-ending ankle surgery in Australia. She was placed on the season ending injury list.

In March 2020, the impending NWSL season was postponed due to the coronavirus pandemic. An eventual restart was made through a smaller schedule 2020 NWSL Challenge Cup tournament. However, on 22 June, Orlando withdrew from the tournament following positive COVID-19 tests among both players and staff.

Melbourne City (2019–2020)
During the NWSL offseason, van Egmond joined Melbourne City ahead of the 2019–20 W-League season. Van Egmond scored a career-high six regular season goals as Melbourne successfully defended their Premiership title and subsequently went on to win the Championship, beating Sydney FC in the final.

West Ham United (2020–2021)
On 28 August 2020, having been unable play since the W-League Championship game in February, Orlando loaned van Egmond to English FA WSL club West Ham United ahead of the 2020–21 season. She scored her first goal for the team on 18 October 2020 in a 4–2 defeat to Manchester United.

In January 2021, van Egmond signed permanently with the club.

In May 2021, van Egmond left West Ham United despite being offered a new contract.

Orlando Pride (2021)
On 7 October 2021, it was announced van Egmond had re-signed with Orlando Pride for the remainder of the 2021 season. She made two substitute appearances for 58 minutes. On 18 January 2022, van Egmond's NWSL playing rights were traded with Taylor Kornieck to San Diego Wave FC in exchange for $125,000 in allocation money and San Diego's natural second-round pick in the 2024 NWSL Draft.

Newcastle Jets (2021–2022)
With van Egmond's NWSL set to expire on 31 December 2021, Orlando Pride transferred her to Newcastle Jets on 7 December so she could immediately join the team for the 2021–22 A-League Women season during the NWSL offseason while retaining her playing rights. The spell was van Egmond's fifth with her hometown team.

International career

Van Egmond represented the Young Matildas at under-20 level. In January 2010, she was called up to the Australia women's national soccer team for a two-match series against Italy, but was unable to play in either match due to an ankle injury. She made her senior debut as a late substitute in a match against DPR Korea on 3 March 2010. During the 2011 FIFA Women's World Cup in Germany seventeen-year-old van Egmond scored to launch Australia to a 2–1 lead over Equatorial Guinea, and helped the squad win 3–2. On 10 June 2021, she played her 100th match for Australia in a friendly match against Denmark.

Van Egmond was selected for the Australian women's football Matildas soccer team which qualified for the Tokyo 2020 Olympics. The Matildas advanced to the quarter-finals with one victory and a draw in the group play. In the quarter-finals they beat Great Britain 4-3 after extra time. However, they lost 1–0 to Sweden in the semi-final and were then beaten 4–3 in the bronze medal playoff by USA. Full details.

Career statistics

International goals

Scores and results list Australia's goal tally first

Honours

Club
Western New York Flash
 Women's Premier Soccer League Elite: 2012

Wolfsburg
 Bundesliga: 2016–17
 DFB-Pokal: 2016–17

Melbourne City
W-League Premiership: 2019–20
W-League Championship: 2019–20

International
 AFF U-16 Women's Championship: 2009
 AFC Olympic Qualifying Tournament: 2016
 Tournament of Nations: 2017
 FFA Cup of Nations: 2019

Individual
 Julie Dolan Medal: 2014

References

External links
 
 

Australian women's soccer players
Living people
1993 births
Australian people of Dutch descent
Newcastle Jets FC (A-League Women) players
Canberra United FC players
Fortuna Hjørring players
Western New York Flash players
OL Reign players
Western Sydney Wanderers FC (A-League Women) players
Chicago Red Stars players
1. FFC Frankfurt players
VfL Wolfsburg (women) players
2011 FIFA Women's World Cup players
2015 FIFA Women's World Cup players
Footballers at the 2016 Summer Olympics
Sportswomen from New South Wales
Soccer players from New South Wales
Sportspeople from Newcastle, New South Wales
National Women's Soccer League players
Women's Premier Soccer League Elite players
Australia women's international soccer players
Australian expatriate sportspeople in the United States
Expatriate women's soccer players in the United States
Olympic soccer players of Australia
Australian expatriate sportspeople in Germany
Expatriate women's footballers in Germany
Orlando Pride players
Women's association football midfielders
2019 FIFA Women's World Cup players
West Ham United F.C. Women players
Women's Super League players
Australian expatriate sportspeople in England
Expatriate women's footballers in England
FIFA Century Club
Footballers at the 2020 Summer Olympics
Australian expatriate women's soccer players
Australian expatriate sportspeople in Denmark
Expatriate women's footballers in Denmark